Richard Donald Meissner (born January 6, 1940) is a Canadian retired professional ice hockey forward who played 171 games in the National Hockey League for the Boston Bruins and New York Rangers between 1959 and 1965. The rest of his career, which lasted from 1956 to 1975, was spent in various minor leagues. Dick is the brother of Barrie Meissner.

Playing career
Meissner played junior hockey with the Humboldt Indians, Estevan Bruins and Flin Flon Bombers from 1956 to 1959. In 1959, Meissner turned professional with the Boston Bruins, and alternately played with the Bruins and minor league teams until 1963, when he was traded to the New York Rangers. Meissner played in the 1963–64 and 1964–65 seasons with the Rangers and its farm teams. Meissner continued solely in the minor leagues after that until 1972. Meissner returned in 1974 with the Portland Buckaroos, but only played part of the season, and retired afterward.

Career statistics

Regular season and playoffs

External links
 

1940 births
Living people
Baltimore Clippers players
Boston Bruins players
Canadian ice hockey forwards
Estevan Bruins players
Hershey Bears players
Ice hockey people from Saskatchewan
Kingston Frontenacs (EPHL) players
Los Angeles Blades (WHL) players
New York Rangers players
Phoenix Roadrunners (WHL) players
Portland Buckaroos players
Providence Reds players
Seattle Totems (WHL) players
St. Louis Braves players
Sportspeople from Kindersley
Western International Hockey League players